Casting Pearls is the self-titled and label-debut album by the Christian rock band Casting Pearls (now known as VOTA). The album was initially released independently in December 2004 by Big Box Records. It was later re-released nationally as a CD-DVD combo from Inpop Records on August 16, 2005, with a slightly rearranged track listing. The DVD side includes a live concert recording of the band playing with fellow Lincoln, Nebraska, band Remedy Drive and special guest Phil Joel at the Rococo Theatre in Lincoln.

Additional musicians
Phil Joel - additional background vocals
Jason Burkum - additional guitar, choir
Maria Schatz, Tracey Colling, Tonja Rose, Marcy Berkum, Rob Harris, Ken Harrell - "Whole World in His Hands" choir

Track listing
 Weighted - 3:21
 Wastin' Time - 3:25
 Alright - 3:27
 Whole World in His Hands - 3:37
 All About Love - 3:04
 Focus - 5:22
 Revolution - 3:59
 Close Your Eyes - 3:15
 Love's Done Something - 3:17
 You Alone - 4:25

References

2005 albums
VOTA albums
Inpop Records albums